AncientFaces is a free online vintage photograph sharing service which aims to build a "portrait of our past" by offering members the opportunity to share and view vintage photographs of their ancestors. AncientFaces was founded in 2000 in California, by Daniel J. Pinna and Carlos Filipe Medeiros

AncientFaces is a platform where genealogists and those interested in history share and discuss old photos. While AncientFaces does not date photos, there are genealogists such as Maureen Taylor (genealogist) who have created careers identifying old photos.

In January 2013, AncientFaces was acknowledged as the 15th most popular genealogy website in the world which had one of the "largest absolute increases in internet traffic of any genealogy website" in 2012.

The website was also recognized by Family Tree Magazine as being one of the 101 Best Genealogy Websites of 2012.

References

Image-sharing websites
American genealogy websites
American photography websites